The 2020 Hawaii Democratic presidential primary had been scheduled to take place on April 4, 2020, a Saturday, in the Democratic Party primaries for the 2020 presidential election, but in-person voting was cancelled due to the COVID-19 pandemic and mail-in voting was extended to May 22, 2020. Instead, voters had until May 22 to submit mail-in ballots. The Hawaii primary was a closed party-run primary, awarding 33 delegates to the 2020 Democratic National Convention, of which 24 were pledged delegates allocated on the basis of the results of the primary. Voters cast ranked-choice voting ballots, with a voter's ballot counting for two ranked backup choices if their original choice was in last place and below the 15 percent threshold for winning delegates.

Former vice president and presumptive nominee Joe Biden won the primary, taking around 61% of the vote and 16 delegates after the distribution of preferences compared to senator Bernie Sanders' 37% and 8 delegates. On the count of first choices, Biden and Sanders had taken approximately 56% and 31% of the vote, while 13% were spread between eight other candidates who had withdrawn from the race, notably senator Elizabeth Warren with 5% and representative Tulsi Gabbard with 4%. On the final count a rather large amount of 4% of the votes were inactive, as they did not include a choice for one of the two candidates that had overcome the 15 percent hurdle.

Procedure
Hawaii had been scheduled to hold its primary on April 4, 2020, along with the Alaska and Louisiana primaries and Wyoming caucuses on the same day, but because of the COVID-19 pandemic the state party decided on March 27, 2020 that all voting had to occur by mail instead and that ballots received by May 22 would be counted.. The Hawaii Democratic Party's draft delegate selection plan published on March 25, 2019, had called for a shift away from caucuses as in previous years to a party-run primary, also known as a firehouse primary or officially a "presidential preference poll", with a limited ranked-choice voting system allowing voters to select their top three choices. Mail-in ballots would have been accepted from March 3 to March 28, 2020.

Voting with paper ballots originally was to take place throughout the state from 7:00 a.m. until 3:00 p.m on a Saturday. Candidates had to meet a threshold of 15 percent at the congressional district or statewide level in order to be considered viable. The 22 pledged delegates to the 2020 Democratic National Convention were allocated proportionally on the basis of the results of the primary. Of these, 7 and 8 were allocated to the two congressional districts, respectively, and another 3 were allocated to party leaders and elected officials (PLEO delegates), in addition to 6 at-large delegates. Originally planned with 22 delegates, the final number included a 10% bonus of 2 additional delegates on the 14 district and 5 at-large delegates by the Democratic National Committee due to the original April date, which belonged to Stage II on the primary timetable.

Before the primary, precinct meetings were held on March 4, 2020, to choose delegates for the state convention. As the state convention, planned for May 23 to May 24, was postponed until September, the state convention delegates voted on national convention district delegates online on June 8, while the state central committee voted on the at-large and pledged PLEO delegates online on June 13. The delegation also included 9 unpledged PLEO delegates: 4 members of the Democratic National Committee, 4 members of Congress (both senators and all two representatives), and the governor David Ige.

Candidates
The following individuals appeared on the ballot in Hawaii:

Running
Joe Biden

Withdrawn

Michael Bloomberg
Pete Buttigieg
Tulsi Gabbard
Amy Klobuchar
Deval Patrick
Bernie Sanders
Tom Steyer
Elizabeth Warren
Andrew Yang

Michael Bennet, John Delaney and Kamala Harris also qualified but withdrew early enough to be taken off the ballot. There was also an uncommited option.

Results
The primary was conducted by ranked-choice voting. Voters were instructed to mark their top three choices on paper ballots. Any voter with a first choice other than Biden or Sanders had their ballot count in the final round if ranking one of those candidates as a second or third choice.

Vote count by round
The ballots were counted separately in each of Hawaii's two Congressional districts.

References

External links
The Green Papers delegate allocation summary
Hawaii Democratic Party delegate selection plan
2020 Hawai’i Democratic Presidential Primary Voters Guide, Democratic Party of Kauai.

Hawaii Democratic
Democratic primary
2020
Hawaii Democratic